Aliabad-e Ziaabad (also Romanized as ‘Alīābād-e Ẕīāābād) is a village in Posht Rud Rural District, in the Central District of Narmashir County, Kerman Province, Iran. At the 2006 census, its population was 514, in 113 families.

References 

Populated places in Narmashir County